Ingo Schultz (born 26 July 1975) is a retired German track and field athlete who competed in the 400 metres.

Career 
Schultz was born in Lingen. He took up athletics in 1997, and ran his first 400 metres race in 1998, clocking in 49.45 seconds. The next season, he lowered his time to 45.99 s.

His personal best time was 44.66 seconds, achieved in the heats at the 2001 World Championships in Edmonton. This places him third on the German all-time list, only behind Thomas Schönlebe and Erwin Skamrahl. His personal best 200 metres time is 20.65 seconds, achieved in August 2002 in Brussels.

Schultz represented the sports clubs LG Olympia Dortmund and TSG Bergedorf. He was the German Athletics Champion for three years in a row, from 2002 until 2004.

Achievements

References

External links 

 

1975 births
Living people
People from Lingen
Sportspeople from Lower Saxony
German male sprinters
German national athletics champions
Olympic athletes of Germany
Athletes (track and field) at the 2004 Summer Olympics
World Athletics Championships medalists
European Athletics Championships medalists